Knowle St Giles is a village and civil parish in the South Somerset district of Somerset, England, situated on the River Isle  south of Ilminster and  north east of Chard. The village has a population of 244.

The parish includes the village of Cricket Malherbie.

History
In the Domesday book of 1086, Knowle St Giles is recorded as having small holdings by five villani and four bordarii. In the medieval period this grew with the reclamation of forest on Windwhistle Hill.

The parish of St Giles Knowles was part of the South Petherton Hundred.

Governance
The parish council has responsibility for local issues, including evaluating local planning applications, initiating projects for the maintenance and repair of parish facilities, consulting with the district council on the maintenance and improvement of highways, drainage, footpaths and street cleaning, working with the police, district council and neighbourhood watch groups on crime, security and traffic, and assessing environmental and conservation matters such as trees and listed buildings.

The village falls within the Non-metropolitan district of South Somerset, which was formed on 1 April 1974 under the Local Government Act 1972, having previously been part of Chard Rural District. The district council is responsible for local planning and building control, local roads, council housing, environmental health, markets and fairs, refuse collection and recycling, cemeteries and crematoria, leisure services, parks, and tourism.

Somerset County Council is responsible for running the largest and most expensive local services such as education, social services, libraries, main roads, public transport, policing and  fire services, trading standards, waste disposal and strategic planning.

It is also part of the  Yeovil county constituency represented in the House of Commons of the Parliament of the United Kingdom. It elects one Member of Parliament (MP) by the first past the post system of election.

Landmarks
Cricket Court was erected as a country house in 1811 for Admiral Stephen Pitt, his family being cousins of the Earl of Chatham.

The road bridge over the River Isle is a Grade II listed building.

Religious sites
The former Church of St Giles is no longer consecrated and has been converted into a private house.

The Church of St Mary Magdalene in Cricket Malherbie, has 12th-century origins, but was rebuilt around 1855 by Rev J.M. Allen. It has been designated by English Heritage as a Grade II* listed building.

References

Villages in South Somerset
Civil parishes in Somerset